XXXchurch.com is a non-profit Christian website that aims to help those who struggle with pornography. It ministers to porn industry performers and consumers. The organization describes itself as a "Christian porn site designed to bring awareness, openness and accountability to those affected by pornography."

Organizational history 
The organization launched in January 2002 when the founders, Mike Foster and Craig Gross, set up a booth inside the AVN Adult Entertainment Expo in Las Vegas to promote the website as an alternative to porn, and it continues to attend porn conventions worldwide. The group has given out thousands of Bibles with "Jesus Loves Porn Stars" on the cover at these conventions, a facet of their ministry which has been featured in American national media.

The organization has received support from prominent Christian pastors such as Bill Hybels, Craig Groeschel and Rick Warren.

Pornographic film director James DiGiorgio took photographs for XXXchurch and lost business as a result of becoming affiliated with the organization. DiGiorgio was not a Christian, but said that he was helping XXXchurch because the sex industry is "always trying to preach freedom of speech [so] anyone in this industry who has a problem with [XXXchurch's] message is a fucking hypocrite. You can't have it both ways."

Mike Foster left the organization in 2004.

In 2005, the independent film Missionary Positions was released, produced and directed by Bill Day, which documented the origins of XXXchurch.

In March 2021, XXXchurch was acquired by Live Free Ministries. Live Free Ministries founder, Carl Thomas was once employed by the 501(c)(3) organization Fireproof Ministries and left to start his own nonprofit.

Programs

Porn debates 
Craig Gross, a cofounder of XXXchurch.com, regularly debated with porn star Ron Jeremy in an event called "The Porn Debate" on college campuses across the United States. In 2008, the debate was featured on ABC News' Nightline both on air and online, with the segment becoming the most watched in Nightline's online viewing history.

X3watch software 
XXXchurch.com produces accountability software (specialized web-surfing monitoring software) called X3watch. The software maintains a log of questionable websites that a user accesses based on content type, and then sends a report to an "accountability partner" of the person's choosing. Such software can be useful for individuals trying to avoid pornography use.

Podcast and radio 
In 2008, the organization launched a video podcast that documents the current campaigns of XXXchurch, which is released every two weeks on XXXchurch.tv and iTunes. It also has several radio public service announcements airing across the US and abroad on various radio stations and syndicated programs such as RadioU, Refuge Radio, Malone University Radio, The Full Armor of God Broadcast and Fuel Radio.

See also 
 Anti-pornography movement in the United States
 Stop Porn Culture

References

Further reading

External links
 
 Fireproof Ministries 
 

Christian websites
Religious organizations established in 2001
Sexuality in Christianity
Anti-pornography movements
Internet properties established in 2001